Marcus Spears may refer to:

 Marcus Spears (offensive tackle) (born 1971), American football player in NFL, 1992–2004 (Chicago Bears, Kansas City Chiefs)
 Marcus Spears (defensive end) (born 1983), American football player in NFL, 2005–2013 (Dallas Cowboys, Baltimore Ravens)